Govedina is an EP released in 2002 by the Belgrade hip hop group Beogradski Sindikat. It was the cause of much controversy in Serbia and Montenegro, due to lyrics which displayed a highly negative attitude towards many actors on the political scene.

See also 
Serbian hip hop

References

EPs by Serbian artists
2002 EPs
Beogradski Sindikat albums